Hojo or Hōjō may refer to:

Hojo or HoJo:

Howard Johnson's, a U.S. chain of restaurants and hotels
A nickname for a number of people named Howard Johnson
A nickname for Howard Jones (British musician), an synthpop singer, musician and songwriter
A nickname for Howard Jones (American singer), a vocalist for several metalcore bands
MGR-1 Honest John, the first nuclear-capable missile and a popular airframe for hobby modelers
Hojo, a supporting character in comic strip Mandrake the Magician
Professor Hojo, a non-playable character in the video game Final Fantasy VII

Hōjō or Houjou:

Hōjō clan, a family of regents of the Kamakura Shogunate
Late Hōjō clan, daimyō in the Sengoku Period
Hōjō, Ehime, a city in Japan
Hōjō, one of the five kata of Kashima Shinden Jikishinkage-ryū
Hōjō, Tottori, a town in Japan (part of Hokuei)
Hōjō Tokiyuki (Scouting) (1858–1929), early Japanese Scouting notable
Hōjō (Inuyasha), a character in the manga and anime series Inuyasha
Hōjō Tsukasa (popularly but incorrectly romanized "Hojo", born 1959), manga artist and creator of City Hunter
Satoko and Satoshi Houjou, from the series Higurashi no Naku Koro ni
Reika Hōjō, from Goshūshō-sama Ninomiya-kun
Kairi Hojo (born 1988), Japanese professional wrestler

See also